Cadick Apartments, also known as the Plaza Building, is a historic apartment building located in downtown Evansville, Indiana.  It was built in 1916, and is a three-story, Beaux-Arts style brick and limestone building. It is located next to the Busse House.

It was listed on the National Register of Historic Places in 1982.

References

Apartment buildings in Indiana
Residential buildings on the National Register of Historic Places in Indiana
Beaux-Arts architecture in Indiana
Residential buildings completed in 1916
National Register of Historic Places in Evansville, Indiana
Residential buildings in Evansville, Indiana